This topic covers notable events and articles related to 2018 in music.

Specific locations

African
American
Asian
Chinese
Japanese
Philippine
South Korean
Canadian
European
British
Scandinavian
Danish
Finnish
Icelandic
Norwegian
Swedish
Latin

Specific genres 

Classical
Country
Heavy metal
Hip hop
Electronic
Jazz
Latin
New Wave 
Opera
Pop
Punk
Rock
R&B 
World music

Albums released

Awards

Bands formed

 Ateez
 AKB48 Team SH
 AKB48 Team TP
 Big Red Machine
 Black Country, New Road
 Boygenius
 The Carters
 D-Crunch
 DreamNote
 Day6
 dps
 The Driver Era
 Empire
 Fanatics - Flavor
 Fantastics from Exile Tribe
 First Place
 Forestella
 Fromis 9
 Hachimitsu Rocket
 (G)I-dle
 Girlkind
 Gugudan SeMiNa
 GWSN
 Honey Popcorn
 Illuminati Hotties
 Iz*One
 JBJ95
 Kids See Ghosts
 King & Prince
 Loona
 LSD
 Maywish
 Mirror
 MNL48
 Nature
 NeonPunch
 NEX7
 Nick Mason's Saucerful of Secrets
 Nine Percent
 Noir
 NTB
 Oceanhoarse
 Oh!GG
 Pattern-Seeking Animals
 Pristin V
 Raise A Suilen
 Rocket Girls 101
 Saturday
 SGO48
 Silk City
 Spectrum
 Spira Spica
 STU48
 Silk City
 The Distillers
 Target
 The Driver Era
 Uijin
 UNB
 Uni.T
 W24
 We Girls
 WJMK
Yoshimotozaka46

Soloist debuts

 AC Bonifacio
 Aina the End
 Aitch
 Aitana
 Akari Nanawo
 Alec Benjamin
 Alfred García
 Alfie Templeman
 Ali Gatie
 Amaia
 Ana Guerra
 Angelo Acosta
 Arlo Parks
 Ash Island
 Ashnikko
 Ava Max
 Beabadoobee
 Bibi
 Chiaki Ito
 Chiaki Satō
 Doja Cat
 Elkie
 Girl in Red
 Giveon
 Halca
 Haruka Yamazaki
 Haon
 Holland
 Hoya
 Hynn
 Janine Berdin
 Jennie
 Jen Ledger
 J-Hope
 Jin Longguo
 Jung Il-hoon
 Karencitta
 Kaori Ishihara
 Katie
 Key
 The Kid Laroi
 Kiyoe Yoshioka
 Kim Dong-han
 King Princess
 Kyle Juliano
 Kyline Alcantara
 Lee Chang-sub
 Lele Pons
 Leo
 Lil Mosey
 Lola Indigo
 Loren Gray
 Mai Fuchigami
 Makoto Furukawa
 Mariah Angeliq
 Meimi Tamura
 Memphiis
 Minori Suzuki
 Mino
 Misako Uno
 Moonbyul
 Onew
 Reona
 Rika Tachibana
 Ryuji Imaichi
 Ryucheru
 Ryusei Yokohama
 Salem Ilese
 Shanti Dope
 Shigeru Joshima
 Shuta Sueyoshi
 Sohee
 Sori
 Son Dong-woon
 Sooyoung
 Taiki Yamazaki
 Tems
 Twlv
 Unique
 Vinxen
 Wheein
 Yoo Seon-ho
 Youra
 Yuka Ozaki
 Yuma Uchida
 Yubin
 Yuri

Bands reformed
 B2K
 BBMak
 The Distillers
 Hootie & The Blowfish
 Late of the Pier
 The Kinks
 Mötley Crüe
 Pussycat Dolls
 The Raconteurs
 Soft Cell
 Spice Girls
 Static-X
 Swedish House Mafia
 Utopia
 Westlife

Bands on hiatus

 Charisma.com
 The Color Morale
 Dark Sermon
 Devin Townsend Project
 Fifth Harmony
 Folks
 fun.
 Heart
 Hedley
 Katatonia
 Karnataka
 Moose Blood
 One Direction
 PWR BTTM
 Rice
 Sads
 Slipknot
 Sorority Noise

Bands disbanded

 7 Seconds
 Alcazar
 at17
 At the Drive-In
 Aqua Timez
 Babyraids Japan
 Balance and Composure
 Bestie 
 Big Bang
 Brand New
 The Charm the Fury
 Chatmonchy
 Cheeky Parade
 Chelsy
 Ciao Bella Cinquetti
 D12
 Dirge Within
 The Fall
 Frightened Rabbit
 GEM
 GMS
 Hedley
 Idol Renaissance
 La PomPon
 LFO
 Mastersystem
 Minus the Bear
 Mix Speaker's,Inc.
 The Orwells
 Owl John
 Passpo
 The Pizza Underground
 Royal Headache
 Runrig
 Rush
 Say Anything
 Seventeen
 Slaughterhouse
 Sleeping Giant
 Soundgarden
 Splashh
 The Strypes
 Tackey & Tsubasa
 Them Are Us Too
 The Thermals
 Ultimate Painting
 Vattnet
 Vallenfyre
 Vanilla Beans
 Wild Beasts
 X21
 Young and in the Way

Deaths

January
 1 
 Jon Paul Steuer, 33, American punk singer and actor
 Betty Willis, 76, American R&B singer
 2 – Rick Hall, 85, American record producer
 3 – Josiah Boyd, 32, American heavy metal bassist (A Hill to Die Upon)
 4 – Ray Thomas, 76, British progressive rock flautist (The Moody Blues)
 5 – Mikio Fujioka, 36, Japanese heavy metal guitarist (Babymetal)
 7 
 France Gall, 70, French pop singer
 Buster Stiggs, 63, British-born New Zealand punk drummer (Suburban Reptiles, The Swingers, Models)
 8 – Denise LaSalle, 83, American blues and R&B singer-songwriter
 9 – Paul Antingnani, American heavy metal drummer (Sworn Enemy)
10 – "Fast" Eddie Clarke, 67, British heavy metal guitarist (Motörhead, Fastway)
12 – Pierre Pincemaille, 61, French classical organist
13 – Tzimis Panousis, 63, Greek comedy singer
15
 Edwin Hawkins, 74, American gospel singer, songwriter and pianist
 Dolores O'Riordan, 46, Irish alternative rock singer-songwriter (The Cranberries)
16
 Dave Holland, 69, English heavy metal drummer (Judas Priest, Trapeze)
 Madalena Iglésias, 78, Portuguese classic pop singer
17 – Ric Jacobs, 61, American pop-rock singer (Steel Breeze)
18 – Steve Nisbett, 69, Nevisian-born British reggae drummer (Steel Pulse)
19 – Fredo Santana, 27, American rapper
20
 Terry Evans, 70, American blues singer and guitarist
 Mario Guccio, 64, Belgian rock singer (Machiavel)
 Jim Rodford, 76, British rock bassist (Argent, The Kinks, The Zombies)
22 – Preston Shannon, 70, American blues singer and guitarist
23 
 Hugh Masekela, 78, South African jazz trumpeter
 Lari White, 52, American country music singer
24 – Mark E. Smith, 60, British post-punk singer-songwriter (The Fall)
25
 Tommy Banks, 81, Canadian jazz pianist
 Steve Foster, Australian folk singer
 Floyd Miles, 74, American blues singer and guitarist
26 
 Buzz Clifford, 76, American pop singer
 Igor Zhukov, 81, Russian classical pianist
27 – Grant Fell, 56, New Zealand industrial rock bassist (Headless Chickens)
28 – Neil Harris, 63, British punk guitarist (Sham 69)
28 
 Eddie Shaw, 80, American blues saxophonist
 Coco Schumann, 93, German jazz guitarist
31 
 Del Delker, 93, American gospel singer
 Leah LaBelle, 31, Canadian-born American R&B singer

February
 1
 Dennis Edwards, 74, American R&B singer (The Temptations)
 Mowzey Radio, 33, Ugandan pop singer (Goodlyfe Crew)
 3 – Leon "Ndugu" Chancler, 65, American jazz and rock drummer
 5 – Zeno Roth, 51, German rock guitarist 
 7
 John Perry Barlow, 70, American rock songwriter (Grateful Dead)
 Mickey Jones, 76, American country-rock drummer (Kenny Rogers and The First Edition)
 Pat Torpey, 64, American hard rock drummer (Mr. Big)
 8 
 Algia Mae Hinton, 88, American blues singer
 Lovebug Starski, 57, American rapper
 Ebony Reigns, 20, Ghanaian dancehall singer
 9 
 Jóhann Jóhannsson, 48, Icelandic film composer
 Craig MacGregor, 68, American rock bassist (Foghat)
 11
 Vic Damone, 89, American pop singer
 Tom Rapp, 70, American psychedelic rock singer (Pearls Before Swine)
 12
 Daryle Singletary, 46, American country singer
 Klaasje van der Wal, 69, Dutch hard rock bassist (Shocking Blue)
 13
 Scott Boyer, 70, American rock singer and guitarist (Cowboy, The 31st of February)
 Billy Johnson, American emo and noise rock drummer (Reggie and the Full Effect, Rocket Fuel Is The Key)
 14 – Nuray Hafiftaş, 53, Turkish folk singer
 16 – Barbara Alston, 74, American R&B singer (The Crystals)
 19 
 Norm Rogers, 61, American alternative country drummer (The Jayhawks, Cows)
 Stormin MC, 34, British grime rapper
 22 – Errol Buddle, 89, Australian jazz bassoonist and saxophonist
 23 – Eddy Amoo, 73, British soul singer (The Real Thing)

March
 1 – Bill Burkette, 75, American pop singer (The Vogues)
 2 
 Jesus Lopez Cobos, 78, Spanish classic music conductor
 Brandon Jenkins, 48, American Red Dirt country singer-songwriter
 Van McLain, 62, American rock guitarist and singer (Shooting Star)
 3
 Patrick Doyle, 31, British indie rock drummer (Veronica Falls)
 Kenneth Gärdestad, 69, Swedish pop songwriter
 7 – Jerzy Milian, 82, Polish jazz vibraphonist
 9 – Pyarelal Wadali, 75, Indian Sufi folk singer (Wadali Brothers)
 11 – Ken Dodd, 90, British comedian and pop singer
 12
 Nokie Edwards, 82, American surf rock guitarist (The Ventures)
 Craig Mack, 47, American rapper
 13 
 Claudia Fontaine, 57, British pop and ska singer (Afrodiziak)
 Jimmy Wisner, 86, American pianist, arranger, songwriter
 14 
 Steve Mandell, 76, American bluegrass guitarist and banjoist
 Liam O'Flynn, 72, Irish uilleann piper
 Charlie Quintana, 56, American punk rock drummer (The Plugz, Cracker, Social Distortion, Agent Orange)
 16 
 Laurence Cleary, 60, Irish new wave guitarist (The Blades)
 Buell Neidlinger, 82, American jazz bassist and cellist
 18 – Killjoy, 48, American death metal singer (Necrophagia, Viking Crown)
 20 – Peter "Mars" Cowling, 72, British blues rock bassist (Pat Travers Band, The Flying Hat Band, Gnidrolog)
 24 – Lys Assia, 94, Swiss pop singer
 25 – Seo Min-woo, 33, South Korean pop singer (100%)
 27 – Kenny O'Dell, 73, American country singer-songwriter
 28 – Caleb Scofield, 39, American alternative rock and sludge metal bassist and singer (Cave In, Zozobra, Old Man Gloom)
 30
 Alias, 41, American rapper and producer
 Sabahudin Kurt, 82, Bosnian folk singer
 Major Short, 93, American double bass player (Somethin' Smith and the Redheads)
 31 – Frode Viken, 63, Norwegian rock guitarist (D.D.E.)

April
1
 Audrey Morris, 89, American jazz singer
 Ron Shaw, 77, American folk singer, guitarist and banjoist (The Hillside Singers)
3 – Lill-Babs, 80, Swedish pop singer
4 – Don Cherry, 94, American pop singer
5 – Cecil Taylor, 89, American jazz pianist
6 – Jacques Higelin, 77, French chanson singer
8 – Nathan Davis, 81, American jazz multi-instrumentalist
9 –  Timmy Matley, 36, Irish pop singer (The Overtones)
10 – Yvonne Staples, 80, American soul singer (The Staple Singers)
14 – Milan Škampa, 89, Czech classical violist (Smetana Quartet)
16 – Dona Ivone Lara, 97, Brazilian samba singer
17 
 Randy Scruggs, 64, American country guitarist and songwriter
 Big Tom, 81, Irish country singer
19
 Stuart Colman, 73, English musician (Pinkerton's Assorted Colours, The Flying Machine), record producer (Shakin' Stevens), and broadcaster
 Reginald McArthur, 63, American R&B singer (The Controllers)
20
 Avicii, 28, Swedish EDM DJ and producer
 Brian Henry Hooper, 55, Australian alternative rock guitarist (Beasts of Bourbon, Kim Salmon and the Surrealists)
 23 – Bob Dorough, 94, American jazz singer and pianist
 24 – Paul Gray, 54, Australian new wave singer, songwriter and keyboardist (Wa Wa Nee)
 26 – Charles Neville, 79, American R&B saxophonist (The Neville Brothers)
 29
 Ted Devoux, 55, American rapper (Boo-Yaa T.R.I.B.E.)
 Rose Laurens, 65, French pop singer-songwriter
30 – Tim Calvert, 52, American heavy metal guitarist (Nevermore, Forbidden)

May
 1
 John "Jabo" Starks, 80, American funk and R&B drummer (The J.B.'s)
 Wanda Wiłkomirska, 89, Polish classical violinist
 2 – Tony Cucchiara, 80, Italian folk singer
 4
 Steve Coy, 56, British new wave drummer (Dead or Alive)
 Tony Kinman, American cowpunk singer and bassist (Rank and File, The Dils)
 Abi Ofarim, 80, Israeli pop singer
 5 – Dick Williams, 91, American pop singer (The Williams Brothers)
 7 – Gayle Shepherd, 81, American pop singer (Shepherd Sisters)
 9
 Ben Graves, 46, American horror punk drummer (Murderdolls)
 Carl Perkins, 59, New Zealand reggae singer (House of Shem)
 Shirley Thomas, 74, American pop singer (The Dixiebelles)
 10 – Scott Hutchison, 36, British indie singer, songwriter and guitarist (Frightened Rabbit, The Fruit Tree Foundation, Mastersystem)
 11 – Matt Marks, 38, American contemporary classical multi-instrumentalist (Alarm Will Sound)
 13 – Glenn Branca, 69, American avant-garde composer and guitarist (Theoretical Girls)
 16 – Hideki Saijo, 63, Japanese pop singer
 17
 Jürgen Marcus, 69, German schlager singer
 Jon Sholle, 70, American jazz, roots music and blues multi-instrumentalist
 19 
 Reggie Lucas, 65, American multi-genre guitarist (Mtume), producer and songwriter
 Patricia Morison, 103, American showtunes singer and actress
 25 – Piet Kee, 90, Dutch classical organist
 27 – Andy MacQueen, Australian punk guitarist (Exploding White Mice)
 28 
 Evio Di Marzo, 64, Venezuelan tropical singer and guitarist (Adrenalina Caribe)
 Stewart Lupton, 43, American indie rock singer (Jonathan Fire*Eater)
 Josh Martin, 46, American grindcore guitarist (Anal Cunt)
 31 – Demba Nabé, 46, German dancehall rapper (Seeed)

June
 1 
 Andrew Massey, 72, British classical conductor 
 Sinan Sakić, 61, Serbian turbo-folk singer (Južni Vetar)
 2 – Wayne Secrest, 68, American bassist (Confederate Railroad)
 3 – Clarence Fountain, 88, American gospel singer (The Blind Boys of Alabama)
 4 – Jalal Mansur Nuriddin, 73, American spoken word poet (The Last Poets)
 5 
 Jimmy Gonzalez, 67, American Tejano singer (Mazz)
 Ralph Santolla, 51, American metal guitarist (Deicide, Obituary, Iced Earth)
 6 – Teddy Johnson, 98, British pop singer (Pearl Carr & Teddy Johnson)
 7 – Al Capps, 79, American arranger, composer and record producer
 8 – Danny Kirwan, 68, British rock and blues guitarist (Fleetwood Mac)
 9 – John McElrath, 77, American rock singer and keyboardist (The Swingin' Medallions)
 10
 Neal E. Boyd, 42, American operatic pop singer
 Ras Kimono, 60, Nigerian reggae singer
 11 – Wayne Dockery, 76, American jazz bassist
 12 – Jon Hiseman, 73, British jazz fusion and blues drummer (Colosseum, Colosseum II, John Mayall & the Bluesbreakers)
 13 – D. J. Fontana, 87, American rock and roll drummer (The Blue Moon Boys)
 15
 Delia Bell, 83, American bluegrass singer (Bill Grant and Delia Bell)
 Nick Knox, 60, American psychobilly drummer (The Cramps, Electric Eels)
 Matt Murphy, 88, American blues guitarist (The Blues Brothers)
 16 – Rebecca Parris, 66, American jazz singer
 18 
 Jimmy Wopo, 21, American rapper
 XXXTentacion, 20, American rapper
 19
 Bansi Quinteros, 41, Spanish psychedelic trance keyboardist (GMS)
 Lowrell Simon, 75, American singer (The Lost Generation)
 21 – David Corcoran, 64, American rock drummer (Duke Jupiter)
 22 
 Geoffrey Oryema, 65, Ugandan afro-pop singer and guitarist
 Vinnie Paul, 54, American metal drummer (Pantera, Damageplan, Hellyeah)
 24
 George Cameron, 70, American baroque pop drummer (The Left Banke)
 Dan Ingram, 83, radio DJ
 26 
 Fedor Frešo, 71, Slovak rock bassist (The Soulmen, Prúdy)
 Ed Simons, 101, American classical music conductor
 27 – Steve Soto, 54, American punk rock bassist (Adolescents, Agent Orange, Manic Hispanic)
 29 – Eugene Pitt, 80, American doo wop singer (The Jive Five)
 30 
Smoke Dawg, 21, Canadian rapper, singer, and songwriter (Halal Gang)
Dean Webb, 81, American bluegrass mandolinist (The Dillards)

July
 2 
 Henry Butler, 69, American jazz pianist
 Alan Longmuir, 70, Scottish pop bassist (Bay City Rollers)
 Bill Watrous, 79, American jazz trombonist
 3 – Richard Swift, 41, American singer-songwriter and multi-instrumentalist (The Shins, The Arcs, Starflyer 59)
 4 – Carmen Campagne, 58, Canadian folk singer
 6 
 Vlatko Ilievski, 33, Macedonian rock singer and guitarist
 Vince Martin, 81, American folk singer
 7 
 Brett Hoffmann, 51, American death metal singer (Malevolent Creation)
 Garry Lowe, 65, Jamaican-born Canadian reggae and blues rock musician (Big Sugar)
 8 – Tab Hunter, 86, American pop singer
 9 – Stefan Demert, 78, Swedish pop singer
 10 – Ye Lwin, 70, Burmese rock guitarist
 13 – K. Rani, 75, Indian playback singer
 15 – Theryl DeClouet, 66, American jazz-funk and R&B singer (Galactic)
 18 – Raivo Rätte, 48, Estonian alternative rock bassist (Kosmikud)
 25 – Patrick Williams, 79, American composer, arranger and conductor
 27 – Mark Shelton, 60, American heavy metal guitarist (Manilla Road)
 28 – Olga Jackowska, 67, Polish rock singer (Maanam)
 29
 Sam Mehran, 31, British dance-punk singer and guitarist (Test Icicles)
 Tomasz Stańko, 76, Polish jazz trumpeter and composer
 31 – Irvin Jarrett, 69, Jamaican reggae percussionist (Inner Circle, Third World)

August
 1 
 Celeste Rodrigues, 95, Portuguese fado singer
 Umbayee, 67, Indian ghazal singer
 2 – Neil Argo, 71, American film and television composer
 3 
 Brad Daymond, 48, Canadian house DJ (Love Inc.)
 Tommy Peoples, 70, Irish folk fiddler (The Bothy Band)
 4 – Lorrie Collins, 76, American rockabilly singer and guitarist (The Collins Kids)
 5 
 Majid Al-Majid, 52, Saudi folk singer
 Ellen Joyce Loo, 32, Canadian-born Hong Kong folktronica singer and guitarist (at17)
 8 – Linda Mkhize, 37, South African rapper
 9 – Arthur Davies, 77, Welsh opera singer
 10 – Jason "J-Sin" Luttrell, 40, American nu-metal vocalist (Primer 55)
 14 
 Jill Janus, 42, American heavy metal singer (Huntress)
 Valentina Levko, 92, Russian opera singer
 Randy Rampage, 58, Canadian thrash metal and punk singer and bassist (Annihilator, D.O.A., Stress Factor 9)
 16
 Aretha Franklin, 76, American R&B and soul singer
 Count Prince Miller, 84, Jamaican-born British singer (Jimmy James and the Vagabonds)
 17 
 Claudio Lolli, 68, Italian pop singer
 Danny Pearson, 65, American R&B singer
 20 – Eddie Willis, 82, American soul and R&B guitarist (The Funk Brothers)
 21 – Spencer P. Jones, 61, Australian punk singer and guitarist (The Johnnys, Beasts of Bourbon)
 22
 Ed King, 68, American rock guitarist (Strawberry Alarm Clock, Lynyrd Skynyrd)
 Lazy Lester, 85, American blues singer and guitarist
 24 – DJ Ready Red, 53, American hip hop DJ (Geto Boys)
 25 – Kyle Pavone, 28, American metalcore singer (We Came as Romans)
 26 – Inge Borkh, 97, German opera singer
 29
 Tony Camillo, 90, American record producer and arranger (Bazuka)
 Ellie Mannette, 90, Trinidadian steelpan drummer
 30 – Joseph Kobzon, 80, Russian pop singer

September
 1 – Randy Weston, 92, American jazz pianist
 2 – Conway Savage, 58, Australian alternative rock keyboardist (Nick Cave & The Bad Seeds)
 4 – Don Gardner, 87, American R&B singer-songwriter
 7
 Don McGuire, 86, American pop singer (The Hilltoppers)
 Mac Miller, 26, American rapper
 8 – Chelsi Smith, 45, American pop singer
 10
 Paul Curcio, 74, American rock guitarist (The Mojo Men) and record producer (Kill 'Em All)
 Johnny Strike, 70, American punk singer and guitarist (Crime)
 12 – Rachid Taha, 59, Algerian rock singer (Carte de Séjour)
 14 – Max Bennett, 90, American jazz and pop bassist (L.A. Express, The Wrecking Crew)
 15 – Helen Clare, 101, British soprano singer
 16
 Maartin Allcock, 61, British folk multi-instrumentalist (Fairport Convention, Jethro Tull)
 Big Jay McNeely, 91, American R&B saxophonist
 18 – Wesley Tinglin, 75, Jamaican reggae singer (The Viceroys)
 22 – Chas Hodges, 74, British folk singer and keyboardist (Chas & Dave)
 24 – Richard Parker, 81, American doo-wop singer (The Charms)
 25 – Paul Dillon, 75, American rock drummer (Earth Opera)
 27 – Marty Balin, 76, American psychedelic rock singer and guitarist (Jefferson Airplane, Jefferson Starship, KBC Band)
 29 
 Otis Rush, 84, American blues singer and guitarist
 Michael Weiley, 58, Australian ska guitarist (Spy vs. Spy)
 30 – Kim Larsen, 72, Danish rock singer and guitarist (Gasolin')

October
 1 
 Charles Aznavour, 94, French pop singer
 Jerry González, 69, American Latin jazz trumpeter
 3
 Hugo Raspoet, 77, Belgian folk singer
 John Von Ohlen, 77, American jazz drummer (Blue Wisp Big Band)
 4 – Hamiet Bluiett, 78, American jazz saxophonist (World Saxophone Quartet)
 5 – Bernadette Carroll, 74, American pop singer (The Angels)
 6 – Montserrat Caballé, 85, Spanish opera singer
 7 – John Wicks, 65, British power pop singer and guitarist (The Records, The Kursaal Flyers)
 8 – Tim Chandler, 58, American Christian alternative rock bassist (Daniel Amos, The Swirling Eddies, The Choir)
 10 – Jane Walker, New Zealand new wave keyboardist (Toy Love)
 12 – Andy Goessling, 59, American progressive bluegrass multi-instrumentalist (Railroad Earth)
 14 – Saleem Abdul Majid, 57, Malaysian rock singer (Iklim)
 16 – Du Yuwei, 19, Chinese pop singer (GNZ48)
 17 
 Valters Frīdenbergs, 30, Latvian pop singer (Valters and Kaža)
 Oli Herbert, 44, American metalcore guitarist (All That Remains)
 18 
Ayub Bachchu, 56, Bangladeshi rock singer and guitarist (Souls, Love Runs Blind)
 Sergey Bondarenko, 31, Ukrainian pop rock singer (Nensi)
Randolph Hokanson, 103, American classical pianist
 23 – Mighty Shadow, 77, Trinidadian calypsonian
 24 
 Hip Hop Pantsula, 38, South African rapper
 Wah Wah Watson, 67, American R&B and funk guitarist (The Funk Brothers)
 Tony Joe White, 75, American swamp rock singer, songwriter and guitarist
 25 – Sonny Fortune, 79, American jazz saxophonist
 26 – Baba Oje, 87, American rapper and musician (Arrested Development)
 27
 Freddie Hart, 91, American country and gospel singer
 Teddy Scott, 82, American R&B singer (The G-Clefs)
 Todd Youth, 47, American punk rock guitarist (Murphy's Law, Danzig, The Chelsea Smiles)
 28 – Babs Beverley, 91, British pop singer (Beverley Sisters)
 29
 Jimmy Farrar, 67, American southern rock singer (Molly Hatchet, Gator Country)
 Young Greatness, 34, American rapper
 30 
 Hardy Fox, 73, American avant garde multi-instrumentalist and composer (The Residents)
 Beverly McClellan, 49, American blues and folk singer
 31 – Kenny Marks, 67, American contemporary Christian singer

November
 1
 Thomas Diaz, 32, American emo singer and musician (The World Is a Beautiful Place & I Am No Longer Afraid to Die)
 Dave Rowland, 74, American country singer (Dave & Sugar)
 2 
Josh Fauver, 39, American indie rock bassist (Deerhunter)
 Roy Hargrove, 49, American jazz trumpeter
 Glenn Schwartz, 78, American rock and blues guitarist (James Gang, Pacific Gas & Electric)
 3 
 Mark Fosson, American primitive guitarist
 Maria Guinot, 73, Portuguese pop singer
 6 – Hugh McDowell, 65, British progressive rock cellist (Wizzard, Electric Light Orchestra)
 7
 Scott Herrick, American pop singer (The Arbors)
 Francis Lai, 86, French film composer
 13 – Lucho Gatica, 93, Chilean bolero singer
 15 
 Roy Clark, 85, American country singer
 Ivan Smirnov, 63, Russian jazz fusion guitarist
 16 
 Al James, 72, British rock guitarist (Showaddywaddy)
 Norris Weir, 72, Jamaican ska singer (The Jamaicans)
 17 – Cyril Pahinui, 68, American Hawaiian music guitarist
 20 
 Roy Bailey, 83, British folk singer, songwriter and guitarist
 Trevor McNaughton, 77, Jamaican reggae singer (The Melodians)
 21 – Devin Lima, 41, American pop singer (LFO)
 22 – Imrat Khan, 83, Indian classical sitarist
 27 – Johnny Maddox, 91, American ragtime pianist
 28
 Gary Haisman, 60, British hip house singer
 Roger Neumann, 77, American jazz saxophonist
 29 – Erik Lindmark, 46, American technical death metal singer and guitarist (Deeds of Flesh)

December
 1 
 Calvin Newborn, 85, American jazz guitarist
 Jody Williams, 83, American blues guitarist
 2 – Perry Robinson, 80, American jazz clarinetist
 6
 Ace Cannon, 84, American pop saxophonist
 Pete Shelley, 63, British punk singer, songwriter and guitarist (Buzzcocks)
 7 
 The Mascara Snake, 70, American avant-garde clarinetist (Captain Beefheart and His Magic Band)
 Lucas Starr, 34, American metalcore and Christian rock bassist (Oh, Sleeper, Terminal, As Cities Burn)
 9 – Yigal Bashan, 68, Israeli pop singer
 10 – Fred Wieland, 75, Australian rock guitarist (The Strangers, The Mixtures)
 11 – Angelo Conti, 62, Italian punk singer (Banda Bassotti)
 13 – Nancy Wilson, 81, American jazz singer
 14
Vida Chenoweth, 90, American classical marimbist and ethnomusicologist
Joe Osborn, 81, American rock bassist (The Wrecking Crew)
 15
Arthur Maia, 56, Brazilian jazz and samba bassist and composer
Jerry Chesnut, 87, American country singer and songwriter
 17 – Galt MacDermot, 89, Canadian-American composer (Hair, Two Gentlemen of Verona) and pianist
 21 – Dipali Barthakur, 77, Indian folk singer
 22
 Indonesian musicians, members of the pop rock band Seventeen
 Windu Andi Darmawan, drummer
 Muhammad Awal Purbani, bassist
 Herman Sikumbang, guitarist
 Jimmy Work, 94, American country singer-songwriter
 23 – Honey Lantree, 75, British pop drummer and singer (The Honeycombs)
 24
 Jerry Riopelle, 77, American pop singer-songwriter and keyboardist (The Parade)
 Jaime Torres, Argentine folk charango player
 James Calvin Wilsey, 61, American rock guitarist (Avengers, Chris Isaak)
 25 – Guto Barros, 61, Brazilian rock guitarist (Blitz)
 26 – Theodore Antoniou, 83, Greek classical music composer and conductor
 27 – Miúcha, 81, Brazilian bossa nova singer
 28 – Christine McGuire, 92, American pop singer (The McGuire Sisters)
 29 – Aldo Parisot, 100, Brazilian-born American classical music cellist
 30 – Mike Taylor, Canadian indie pop keyboardist (Walk Off the Earth)
31
 Dean Ford, 72, Scottish pop and rock singer-songwriter (Marmalade, The Alan Parsons Project)
 Ray Sawyer, 81, American rock singer and percussionist (Dr. Hook & the Medicine Show)

See also 

 Timeline of musical events
 Women in music

References

 
2018-related lists
Music by year
Music
Culture-related timelines by year